Stepanikha is a rural locality (a village) in Tiginskoye Rural Settlement, Vozhegodsky District, Vologda Oblast, Russia. The population was 67 as of 2002.

Geography 
The distance to Vozhega is 21 km, to Gridino is 1 km. Shchegolikha, Levinskaya, Malaya, Gridino, Pesok, Nikitinskaya, Leshchevka are the nearest rural localities.

References 

Rural localities in Vozhegodsky District